Money Shot (stylized as Money $hot) is the third studio album by Puscifer, released on October 30, 2015.

Release
On July 29, 2015, the album was announced via the release of the first single, "Grand Canyon".

The vinyl version features an exclusive mix of "Simultaneous" featuring Daniel Ash (Bauhaus/Love And Rockets).

Remix album
On November 25, 2016 a remix album with versions of tracks from Money Shot was released, entitled Money Shot Your Re-Load.

Critical reception

Writing for Exclaim, Calum Slingerland noted that while the record is more focused compositionally than its predecessor, Conditions of My Parole, the increased presence of vocalist Carina Round and the consistent desert-weary feel of the work are undeniable positives.

Track listing
All songs written by Maynard James Keenan, Mat Mitchell & Carina Round, except where noted.

Personnel
Adapted from the album credits.
 Maynard James Keenan – lead vocals
 Carina Round – lead vocals (tracks 1–7, 9–11)
 Mat Mitchell – bass, guitar, keyboards, mandolin (1, 2), banjo (11)
 Jeff Friedl – drums (1, 2, 3, 5, 6, 7)
 Jon Theodore – drums (6, 7, 11) 
 Matt McJunkins – bass (2, 5)
 Juliette Commagere – keyboards (1, 2, 4, 6, 7, 11), background vocals (6)
 Tim Alexander – drums (2)

Charts

Money Shot Your Re-Load

Money Shot Your Re-Load is a remix album by Puscifer. It was released on November 25, 2016 by Puscifer Entertainment. It contains alternate versions, remixes and reworks of the 11 songs from Puscifer's third studio album, Money Shot. The album also features previous contributors, such as Carina Round, and new remixers, such as Tool bassist Justin Chancellor and The Crystal Method member Scott Kirkland, as remixers. The album was released on special colored double vinyl for Record Store Day, with two additional tracks, one of which is exclusive to the vinyl format.

Track listing

References

Puscifer albums
2015 albums